Benfica is a Neighborhood in Huambo city in Angola.

References 

Huambo